Blossom Sisters is a 2010 South Korean weekend family drama series starring Song Seon-mi, Maya, Lee Yoon-ji, Jung Chan, Jung Woo, Kim Dong-wook, Yoo Dong-geun and Yang Mi-kyung. It aired on MBC from January 30 to July 25, 2010 on Saturdays and Sundays at 19:55 for 50 episodes.

Plot
Blossom Sisters covers the lives of three sisters.

Eldest sister Ji-won (Song Seon-mi) is married to a dentist (Jung Chan) from a wealthy family.  Although her husband is deemed perfect by everyone else, he controls every aspect of Ji-won's life.  He demands she keep the same weight as when she was 23, chooses her clothes, and expects a full report of how she spent her day.  In time, the husband's oppressive behavior leads Ji-won to question her marriage.

Middle sister Mi-won (Maya) met her boyfriend (Jung Woo) in college, and they eloped. They live together even though they're not married.

Youngest sister Hye-won (Lee Yoon-ji) represents women of the newer generation. She believes her career is more important than marriage. Due to pressure from her parents, Hye-won enters a contract marriage with her colleague Jae-ha (Kim Dong-wook). She then starts to discover the true meaning of love and life.

Cast

Park family
Yoo Dong-geun as Park Sang-gil, father 
Yang Mi-kyung as Kim Sook-kyung, mother
Song Seon-mi as Park Ji-won, eldest daughter
Maya as Park Mi-won, middle daughter
Lee Yoon-ji as Park Hye-won, youngest daughter
Jung Chan as Min Myung-seok, Ji-won's husband
Jung Woo as Kim No-sik, Mi-won's live-in boyfriend
Baek Jin-ki as Kim Yong-yi, Mi-won's son

Lee family
Kim Ki-seob as Lee Hyo-dong, father
Kim Dong-wook as Lee Jae-ha, son
Oh Young-shil as Lee Jae-kyung, daughter
Hong Hak-pyo as Gong Byung-goo, Jae-kyung's husband

Extended cast
Lee Mi-young as Lee Pil-nam
Kim Jung-min as Jung Tae-hwan
Jung Ae-ri as Yoon Sun-hee
Oh Jung-se as Jae-hoon/Jay
Lee Byung-wook as Jung Sung-jae, department head
Kim Kyung-hwa as Kim, team leader
Maeng Chang-jae as Choi Jin-moo
Im Hyun-sung as Jung-pil
Jeon In-taek
Shim Yang-hong

References

External links
Blossom Sisters official MBC website 

MBC TV television dramas
2010 South Korean television series debuts
2010 South Korean television series endings
Korean-language television shows
South Korean romance television series